Mota, MOTA or variations thereof may refer to:

Geography
 Mota (island), Vanuatu
 Mota, Ethiopia, a town
 Mota, Gujarat, India, a town
 Mota, Ljutomer, Slovenia, a village

Music
 M.O.T.A. (album), by Cultura Profética, 2005
 "Mota", a song by the Offspring from the album Ixnay on the Hombre, 1997

People
 Mota (surname)
 Mota Singh (1930–2016), British judge and the UK's first Asian judge
 Mota (footballer, born 1980), João Soares da Mota Neto, Brazilian football striker

Other uses
 Mota language, the language spoken in the island of Mota
 Mota (butterfly), a genus of butterflies including Mota massyla
 MotA, a bacterial protein and gene
 MOTA (motorcycles), a German motorcycle brand

See also
 Motta (disambiguation)